Martín de Córdoba Mendoza, O.P. (1512–1581) was a Spanish Roman Catholic prelate who served as Bishop of Córdoba (1578–1581), Bishop of Plasencia (1574–1578), and Bishop of Tortosa (1560–1574).

Biography
Martín de Córdoba Mendoza was born in Córdoba, Spain on 3 November 1512 and ordained a priest in the Order of Preachers.
On 17 July 1560, he was appointed during the papacy of Pope Pius IV as Bishop of Tortosa.
On 4 June 1574, he was appointed during the papacy of Pope Gregory XIII as Bishop of Plasencia.
On 13 June 1578, he was appointed during the papacy of Pope Gregory XIII as Bishop of Córdoba.
He served as Bishop of Córdoba until his death on 5 June 1581. 
While bishop, he was the principal consecrator of Lorenzo Figueroa Córdoba, Bishop of Sigüenza (1579); and Jerónimo Manrique de Lara, Bishop of Salamanca (1579).

See also
Catholic Church in Spain

References

External links and additional sources
 (for Chronology of Bishops)  
 (for Chronology of Bishops) 
 (for Chronology of Bishops) 
 (for Chronology of Bishops) 

16th-century Roman Catholic bishops in Spain
Bishops appointed by Pope Pius IV
Bishops appointed by Pope Gregory XIII
1512 births
1581 deaths
Dominican bishops